The Municipal District of Provost No. 52 is a municipal district (MD) in east-central Alberta, Canada, on the Alberta/Saskatchewan border. Located in Census Division No. 7, its municipal office is located in the Town of Provost.

History 
The MD of Provost No. 52 was established in 1943 through the amalgamation of the MD of Hillcrest No. 362 and the MD of Sifton No. 391.

Geography

Communities and localities 
 
The following urban municipalities are surrounded by the MD of Provost No. 52.
Cities
none
Towns
Provost
Villages
Amisk
Czar
Hughenden
Summer villages
none

The following hamlets are located within the MD of Provost No. 52.
Hamlets
Bodo
Cadogan
Hayter
Metiskow

The following localities are located within the MD of Provost No. 52.
Localities 
Airways
Battle Ridge
Buffalo View
Cairns
Cousins
Craigmillar
Green Glade
Kessler
Lakesend
Neutral Hills
Nilrem
Rosenheim
Rosyth

Demographics 

In the 2016 Census of Population conducted by Statistics Canada, the MD of Provost No. 52 had a population of 2,205 living in 825 of its 930 total private dwellings, a  change from its 2011 population of 2,288.

See also 
List of communities in Alberta
List of municipal districts in Alberta

References

External links 

 
Provost